The Phoenix Tree is a 1984 novel from Australian author Jon Cleary set in Japan during the last days of World War II.

Cleary said he was attracted by the chance to do something different and write from a Japanese mind-set.

The novel is set during the end of World War II. It deals with the bombing of Tokyo and the devastation of Hiroshima and Nagasaki, and revolves around the themes of war and peace.

References

1984 Australian novels
Novels set in Japan
Novels set during World War II
Fiction set in 1945
William Collins, Sons books
Novels by Jon Cleary
Japan in non-Japanese culture